The Elder Scrolls is an action role-playing open world video game series developed by Bethesda Game Studios and published by Bethesda Softworks. The Elder Scrolls games take place in the fictional world of Nirn, on the continent of Tamriel. The first game, The Elder Scrolls: Arena, was released in 1994. It was intended for players to assume the role of an arena combatant, but development shifted the game into a role-playing game (RPG), beginning a tradition that persists throughout the series' history. The Elder Scrolls II: Daggerfall was published in 1996, and it featured one of the first true 3D worlds on a large scale, with a game world claimed to be the size of Great Britain. The Elder Scrolls III: Morrowind, released in 2002, saw a return to the old-style expansive and non-linear gameplay, and a shift towards individually detailed landscapes, with a smaller game world than past titles. The game sold over four million units by mid-2005. Two expansions were released between 2002 and 2003: Tribunal and Bloodmoon.

Development of The Elder Scrolls IV: Oblivion began in 2002, and focused on artificial intelligence improvements that interact dynamically with the game world. Released in 2006, the game achieved commercial success and critical acclaim; expansion packs Knights of the Nine and Shivering Isles were released for the game. The Elder Scrolls V: Skyrim followed in November 2011 to critical acclaim. The game is not a direct sequel to its predecessor, Oblivion, but instead takes place 200 years later, in Tamriel's land of Skyrim. Three expansion sets, Dawnguard, Dragonborn and Hearthfire,  have been released. The Elder Scrolls Online, a massively multiplayer role-playing video game developed by ZeniMax Online Studios, was announced on May 3, 2012. The game is the first open-ended multiplayer installment of the franchise, and most of the continent of Tamriel is playable in the game. The Elder Scrolls Online had been in development for 5 years prior to its announcement and was released on April 4, 2014.

Video games

Main games

Expansions and other games

Notes

References

Elder Scrolls games